Richard Tritschler (September 10, 1883 – November 15, 1954) was an American gymnast. He competed in three events at the 1904 Summer Olympics.

References

External links
 

1883 births
1954 deaths
American male artistic gymnasts
Olympic gymnasts of the United States
Gymnasts at the 1904 Summer Olympics
Sportspeople from St. Louis